Prince of Moscow may refer to:

Grand Princes of Moscow see List of Russian rulers#Grand Princes of Moscow
Napoleon's Princes of Moscow, see: Prince de la Moskowa